This is a discography for Canadian country rock group Blue Rodeo.

Albums

Studio albums

1980s albums

1990s albums

2000s albums

2010s albums

2020s albums

Live albums

Compilation albums

Box sets

Singles

1980s singles

1990s singles

2000s singles

2010s singles

2020s singles

Videography

Video albums
Blue Movies (1991)
In Stereovision (2004) - Certified 3× Platinum by the CRIA.
Toronto Rocks (SARSfest) (2004) - Canadian edition featuring Blue Rodeo.

Video singles
Watch This! (2004) - Features the video of Blue Rodeo's hit single, "Bulletproof."

Soundtrack appearances
 "I'm Checkin' Out" with Meryl Streep (from Postcards from the Edge) (1990)

Music videos

Notes

A^ The Days in Between also peaked at number 5 on the Canadian RPM Country Albums chart.
B^ "Til I Am Myself Again" also peaked at number 19 on the US Modern Rock chart and number 37 on the US Mainstream Rock chart.
C^ "Always Getting Better" also peaked at number 41 on the Canadian RPM Adult Contemporary tracks chart.

References

External links
 

Discographies of Canadian artists
Country music discographies
Rock music group discographies
Discography